Artipe is a genus of butterflies in the family Lycaenidae. The species of this genus are found in the Indomalayan realm, the Palearctic realm (Himalayas - China), and the Australasian realm (New Guinea).

Genus Artipe was erected by Jean Baptiste Boisduval in 1870.

Species
Artipe anna (Druce, 1896)
Artipe eryx (Linnaeus, 1771) - green flash
Artipe grandis (Rothschild & Jordan, 1905) New Guinea
Artipe dohertyi (Oberthür, 1894) New Guinea

External links
"Artipe Boisduval, 1870" at Markku Savela's Lepidoptera and Some Other Life Forms

 
Deudorigini
Lycaenidae genera
Taxa named by Jean Baptiste Boisduval